West Syriac usually refers to the West Syriac Rite.

West Syriac or Western Syriac may also refer to:
 West Syriac Rite, liturgical rite of the Syriac Orthodox Church, and the Syriac Catholic Church.
 West Syriac alphabet, western form of the Syriac alphabet
 Western Syriac, the western dialect/pronunciation system of the Classical Syriac language.
 Surayt/Turoyo, sometimes colloquially referred to as "Western (Neo-)Syriac".

See also
 East Syriac (disambiguation)
 Syriac (disambiguation)
 Syriac Christianity
 Syriac language
 Syriac Rite (disambiguation)
 West Syriac Church (disambiguation)